A. Kalpana of DMK party is the sixth and incumbent mayor of Coimbatore city, Tamil Nadu. She succeeded Ganapathi P. Raj Kumar of All India Anna Dravida Munnetra Kazhagam as the first women mayor of the city after the local body elections held in the city in 2022.

Mayoral election
In the mayoral elections of Coimbatore city in the year 2022, A. Kalpana  on the side of DMK won in an indirect election with the support of 96 councillors.

References

Living people
Mayors of Coimbatore
Dravida Munnetra Kazhagam politicians
Year of birth missing (living people)